Akeldama is the debut studio album by technical death metal band The Faceless. It was released on November 14, 2006 through Sumerian Records. The title of the album is Aramaic for "Field of Blood". It was produced by Michael Keene.

Sound and genre
Akeldama is the only album by The Faceless to incorporate a deathcore sound and style. Breakdowns and metalcore riffs are frequent on the release. The band abandoned their deathcore sound after this album.

Track listing

Personnel 

The Faceless
 Derek Rydquist — lead vocals 
 Michael Keene — lead guitar, clean vocals, spoken word, vocoder speech
 Steve Jones — rhythm guitar
 Brandon Giffin — bass guitar
 Michael Sherer — keyboards
 Brett Batdorf, Andy Taylor, Navene Koperweis, Nick Pierce— drums (see below)

Artwork and design
Album artwork & layout by Nick Steinhardt (23 in. graphics)

Production and recording
Engineered, Produced, Mixed & mastered by Michael Keene @ Keene Machine Studios, Tarzana, CA
Drums recorded by Andy Taylor (tracks: 2, 5), Brett Batdorf (tracks: 1, 3, 6, 8), Navene Koperweis (track: 4), Nick Pierce (track: 7)
Management by Joe Sarrach (Astrum Entertainment)
Booking by Ash Avildsen (EE Booking)

References 

2006 debut albums
The Faceless albums
Sumerian Records albums